Evelyn Martin Lansdowne Beale FRS (8 September 1928 – 23 December 1985) was an applied mathematician and statistician who was one of the pioneers of mathematical programming.

Career
He was educated at Winchester College and at Trinity College, Cambridge, graduating with First Class Honours in mathematics in 1949 and gaining a diploma in mathematical statistics in 1950. He then joined the Mathematics Group at the UK Admiralty Research Laboratory, working under Stephen Vajda for 11 years, except for a leave of absence in 1957/58 to assist the Statistical Techniques Research Group at Princeton University. In 1955 he extended George Dantzig's Simplex Algorithm to minimise a quadratic function.

In 1961 he became a founder member of a computer services company C.E.I.R (UK), which BP bought and renamed Scicon, and in 1967 he became visiting professor at Imperial College, London.

Beale was chairman of the Mathematical Programming Society from 1974 to 1976, vice-president of the Royal Statistical Society from 1978 to 1980, a Fellow of the British Computer Society, and a member of the International Statistical Institute. In 1979, he was elected a Fellow of the Royal Society "for his applications of mathematical and statistical techniques to industrial problems and for his contributions to the theory of mathematical programming", and he was elected to the Council of the Royal Society in 1984. He was awarded the Silver Medal of the Operational Research Society in 1980, and became vice-president of the Institute of Mathematics and its Applications.  He was also non-executive chairman of Beale International Technology.

The Times suggested that he "used his blend of theory and state-of-the-art practice to encourage several generations of young mathematicians and computer scientists," and that his "many papers and his seminal book Mathematical Programming in Practice were major influences in their field, with their succinctness and clarity."

Beale's FRS memoir mentioned his "extraordinary skill" and "substantial contributions to knowledge".

Memorials
 The Mathematical Programming Society awards the "Beale–Orchard-Hays" Prize in memory of him and William Orchard-Hays.
 The Operational Research Society awards the Beale Medal for "the most outstanding sustained contribution to Operational Research".
 A two-day symposium was held in his memory at the Royal Society in 1987.
 The book Questions of Truth is dedicated to him and Ruth Polkinghorne.
 He makes a cameo appearance in E.M. Delafield's A Provincial Lady Goes Further.

Publications
Beale produced over 100 scholarly papers and two books:
 
  (Based on his lecture notes and working papers at Scicon and edited by his former colleague Lynne Mackley.)

Family
Beale was a son of Muriel Rebecca Beale OBE, descendant of General Sir John Slade, grandniece of Edmond Warre, niece of Henry Adolphus Warre Slade, daughter of Marcus Warre Slade Queen's Counsel, and first cousin of Madelaine Slade. He was survived by his wife and three children.

References

1928 births
1985 deaths
20th-century British mathematicians
Fellows of the British Computer Society
Fellows of the Royal Statistical Society
People educated at Winchester College
Alumni of Trinity College, Cambridge
Fellows of the Royal Society
Elected Members of the International Statistical Institute